Thomas Shigwedha (born 22 August 1995) is a Namibian long-distance runner.

In 2019, he competed in the senior men's race at the 2019 IAAF World Cross Country Championships held in Aarhus, Denmark. He finished in 113th place.

References

External links 
 

Living people
1995 births
Place of birth missing (living people)
Namibian male long-distance runners
Namibian male cross country runners